Body building at the 2015 Pacific Games in Port Moresby, Papua New Guinea was held on July 13, 2015 at the Caritas Secondary School. In the men's competition Papua New Guinea won five gold medals. Tonga won three gold medals in the men’s heavy categories, as well as the men’s overall title which went to Trevor Huni. New Caledonia and American Samoa took one gold medal each in the women's competition. Virginie Foucault won the overall women's title.

Medal summary

Medal table

Men's Results

Notes

 The original silver medallist, Stanley Bruneau of Tahiti, was disqualified after testing positive for a prohibited drug. Donald Kaiwi was awarded the silver medal. Fiji's Jekesoni Yanuyanudrua was awarded the bronze medal.

Women's Results

References

2015
2015 Pacific Games
Pacific Games